Overdose (2 April 2005 in Nottinghamshire, Great Britain – 1 July 2015 in Germany) was a Hungarian Thoroughbred racehorse. During his career he was victorious in sixteen of his nineteen races.

Breeding
Overdose was English-bred and was sold at Tattersalls December Yearling Sales in November 2006 for just 2,000 guineas (£2,100). His sire was a miler called Starborough and he was out of Our Poppet (IRE) by Warning. He was a half-brother of three winners.

His owner, Zoltán Mikóczy purchased Overdose only by chance and has been quoted as saying "I just put my hand up for fun, I like excitement of the horse auctions. I thought no horse can go this cheap and surely somebody else would bid. He's short and I'd say kind of ugly, so of course nobody wanted him."

Racing career
Overdose had an unbeaten series of 14 races. In these races he won with a total of 116,5 lengths, which means 8,3 lengths per race in average.

He ran a new track record at his home track (Kincsem Park, Budapest, Hungary), for his first ever race (in which he was victorious with 18 lengths).

In 2008 he was named Wunderpferd (wonderhorse) in Germany, for winning German sprint races – including the Group 2 Goldene Peitsche – in such a dominant style.

He won a Group I race at Longchamp, but the race was declared void due to a non-opening gate. His time was only 0,1 second behind the track record of Habibti. He did not participate in the re-run at the end of the day, since his unbeaten record was at risk. Only a month later Overdose won a Group III race in Rome, with a dominating 10 lengths.

In the 2008 world thoroughbred rankings Overdose was among the top sprinters (4th at Timeform with a rating of 126, and 6th at IFHA with 120), despite he did not win a Group I race (at least not officially).

In 2009 Christophe Soumillon volunteered to ride the horse.  After his year opening race at Kincsem Park, Budapest, Overdose was called the Budapest Bullet in Britain, and appeared on the cover of the New York Times, which named him the "Hungarian Seabiscuit".

In mid-2009 one of his hooves became inflamed, which resulted in laminitis. This put the horse's whole career in danger. His recovery lasted for 15 months. Overdose returned in July 2010, with two victories in Bratislava and Budapest, growing his unbeaten record to 14 races.

Overdose lost his unbeaten record in his 15th race under disputed circumstances. In Germany, Baden-Baden, the starter waited eight minutes to get him into the startbox. During this time his rider Christophe Soumillon fell from his saddle thrice. This "procedure" resulted in a hopeless race for him. Although he led to 1000 meters, Overdose lost too much power when entering the startbox, therefore he was unable to keep the pace in the last furlong, and finished only seventh. Professionals says that the German starter was under great pressure, since Overdose's comeback was in the centre of the communication of the racetrack's actual festival (the Große Woche), and the stands were full, since everybody was keen to see Overdose. After this race the horse has suffered another, but minor injury, which resulted in the miss of the remaining of the season.

In 2011 he started the season in Berlin, Germany, with a dominating victory, and ran a new track record. This was the season-opening raceday of the track, and there was a full house. After this great result Overdose was the favourite of all British bookmakers for both of his forthcoming races in the United Kingdom; the Temple Stakes and the King's Stand Stakes.

On the day of his long waited first race in Britain, Overdose appeared on the cover of four newspapers. Second time on Racing Post's cover that week (the first occasion has been his arrival to Britain). He was in the centre of the television broadcast as well. Unfortunately Overdose's travel took three days from Hungary to Britain, and the five days he spent in Britain before the race was not enough to regenerate. Maybe this was the reason why Overdose only placed seventh by four lengths behind the winner in the Group II Temple Stakes. But the team knew, there is more in him, therefore they have stayed in Britain, to prepare him for the Royal Ascot. After the Haydock race Overdose was able to regenerate during the remaining three weeks to his Royal Ascot race. He was not a favourite anymore. He started in the Group I King's Stand Stakes on the lead, and ran head to head with the Hong Kong superstar Sweet Sanette in the forthcoming furlongs. In the end Overdose finished fourth, only a length away from the winner, and a neck away from Sweet Sanette. The remaining horses were more than two lengths away from the winning four. After the race the officials of the Ascot Racecourse said that they had never seen a horse performing in such a high level after suffering laminitis.

Another minor injury resulted in the horse's missing of almost all races of the autumn season, and Overdose was able to race again in November only; the second time in Rome, and for the first time with Frankie Dettori. This time Overdose won with only a half length, but he was spared, Dettori did not ask for more from him.

In February 2012, Overdose suffered a serious injury at Meydan Racecourse, in the very beginning of the 2012 Dubai Racing Carnival.

Jockeys
 2007. Martin Srnec, Zdenko Smida, Piotr Krowicki
 2008. Piotr Krowicki, Andreas Suborics
 2009. Christophe Soumillon
 2010. Gary Hind, Christophe Soumillon
 2011. Andreas Suborics, Frankie Dettori

Race record

Overdose suffered a serious injury at Meydan Racecourse, just before the beginning of the 2012 Dubai Racing Carnival. After that he was retired from racing and was available at Bábolna-Dióspuszta Stud in Hungary in 2014 first, then in 2015 at Vollblutgestüt Lindenhof in Germany.

(Note, that G1, G2 and G3 means internationally recognized Group 1, Group 2 and Group 3 races, while Gr1, Gr2 and Gr3 means Grade 1, Grade 2 and Grade 3 races, recognized in Hungary, Slovakia and Austria.)

See also
List of leading Thoroughbred racehorses
List of historical horses

References

Pedigree

External links

 Overdose pedigree on pedigreequery.com
 Official homepage in Hungarian

2005 racehorse births
2015 racehorse deaths
Sport in Hungary
Racehorses trained in Hungary
Racehorses bred in the United Kingdom
Thoroughbred family 7-a